Iwan Setiawan (born 5 July 1958), is an Indonesian former football player who currently works as a football coach for Liga 3 club PS Siak.

References

1958 births
Living people
Indonesian footballers
Association footballers not categorized by position
Indonesian football managers
Sportspeople from Medan